CKD may refer to:

Chronic kidney disease, a slowly progressive loss of renal function
Complete knock down, a complete kit needed to assemble a product
Count Key Data, a disk architecture used in IBM mainframe computers
ČKD (Českomoravská Kolben-Daněk), an engineering company in the Czech Republic
Crooked Creek Airport in Alaska, United States (IATA airport code)